is a railway station on the Hitahikosan Line in Hita, Ōita Prefecture, Japan. It is operated by JR Kyushu and is on the Hitahikosan Line.

Lines
Services to the station are currently suspended due to damage from torrential rainfall.

Layout 
The station consists of a side platform serving a single track. It is unstaffed and serves only as a waiting room.

Adjacent stations

History
On 1 April 1960, this track was linked to tracks further north and became part of the Hitahikosan Line. With the privatization of Japanese National Railways (JNR), the successor of JGR, on 1 April 1987, JR Kyushu took over control of the station.

Train services along the sector, which includes Ōtsuru, were cancelled. JR Kyushu has not announced a date for the resumption of service apart from stating that the suspension will be for an indefinite period.

Passenger statistics
In fiscal 2015, there were a total of 10,416 boarding passengers, giving a daily average of 29 passengers.

See also
 List of railway stations in Japan

References

External links
Ōtsuru (JR Kyushu)

Railway stations in Ōita Prefecture
Railway stations in Japan opened in 1937